Carl Friedrich von Siemens Foundation or Carl Friedrich von Siemens Stiftung is an independent foundation in Germany with the goal of promoting the humanities and the sciences. It is named after Carl Friedrich von Siemens and was founded in 1958 by Ernst von Siemens. Heinrich Meier was its Director until March 2022.

Since 1960, it has been running extensive scientific programs, awarding fellowships to outstanding scientists and scholars, and supporting university libraries in Germany with more than 60 million euros for the acquisition of scientific literature.

History

Ernst von Siemens, Chairman of the Supervisory Board of Siemens AG from 1956 to 1971, established the Foundation from his private assets. It bears the name of his father Carl Friedrich von Siemens, who was also Chairman of the Supervisory Board of Siemens Group between 1919 and 1941. From 1964 the foundation's managing director was the publicist Armin Mohler, and in 1985 Heinrich Meier succeeded Mohler.

The foundation under Armin Mohler 1964–1985
Mohler used the foundation mainly for political events. An example of this is a famos series on Carl Schmitt organized by Mohler in 1978. The lectures were then published by Propyläen-Verlag under the title Der Ernstfall as the second volume in the Foundation's series of publications, even though Schmitt was academically and journalistically isolated because of his commitment to Nazi Germany. Speakers were Among others Knut Borchardt, Paul Carell, Hellmut Diwald and Christian Meier. The series was understood as a tribute to Schmitt. Other publications of the foundations also dealt with persons or topics related to the New Right.

In 1980, the historian Ernst Nolte gave a lecture at the Carl Friedrich von Siemens Foundation entitled Zwischen Geschichtslegende und Revisionismus (Between Historical Legend and Revisionism), which the Frankfurter Allgemeine Zeitung published, thus triggering the Historikerstreit, the so-called historians' dispute.

The foundation under Heinrich Meier 1985–2022
Today the foundation has the following priorities:

 To organize scientific, interdisciplinary lecture series by individual speakers and to publish them.Some speakers who have given lectures at the Foundation includes Jan Assmann, Ernst-Wolfgang Böckenförde, Jean Bollack, J. M. Coetzee, Richard Dawkins, Daniel Dennett, Philippe Descola, Louis Dumont, Ronald Dworkin, Ágnes Heller, Paul Kirchhof, Jean-François Lyotard, Peter von Matt, Ernst Mayr, Ilya Prigogine, Martin Rees, Karl Schlögel, Wolf Singer, Andreas Urs Sommer and Helen Vendler. Some of the lectures are published in the series Themen der Carl Friedrich von Siemens Stiftung (since 1985 more than 40 volumes have been published).
 To award the Carl Friedrich von Siemens Fellowships to outstanding scientists (since 1993). These fellowships support the completion of research by outstanding scientists.
 To support the supplement of scientific literature, which includes the supply of university libraries.
 To organize guest events, scientific conferences and international symposia. Special emphasis is placed on promoting contact between German and foreign scientists.

Critique
Numerous experts on right-wing extremism, such as Peter Glotz consider the Carl Friedrich von Siemens Foundation under the management of Armin Mohlers to be a think tank of the New Right and assign the foundation to the New Right.

References

External links
Official Website

Foundations based in Germany
1958 establishments in Germany
Siemens